Ryszard Dołomisiewicz (born 1 February 1966) is a former international speedway rider from Poland.

Speedway career
Dołomisiewicz reached the final of the Speedway World Championship in the 1986 Individual Speedway World Championship.

He rode in the top tier of Polish Speedway from 1982 to 1991, riding for Polonia Bydgoszcz.

World final appearances

Individual World Championship
 1986 -  Chorzów, Silesian Stadium - 11th - 6pts

World Pairs Championship
 1991 -  Poznań, Olimpia Poznań Stadium (with Piotr Świst / Wojciech Załuski) - 7th - 9pts

References

1966 births
Living people
Polish speedway riders
Polonia Bydgoszcz riders